Charles Jefferson Albright (May 9, 1816 – October 21, 1883) was a U.S. Representative from Ohio.

Born in Carlisle, Pennsylvania, Albright moved with his parents in 1824 to Allegheny County, Pennsylvania.
He received a limited schooling.
He was employed in a harness shop and as a clerk in a rural store.
Apprenticed as a printer.
He moved to Guernsey County, Ohio, in 1832 and settled on a farm near Cambridge.
He was owner and publisher of the Guernsey Times 1840-1845 and 1848-1855.
He served as secretary of the Guernsey County Board of School Examiners 1841-1844.

Albright was elected as an Opposition Party candidate to the Thirty-fourth Congress (March 4, 1855 – March 3, 1857).
He was an unsuccessful candidate for reelection in 1856 to the Thirty-fifth Congress.
He served as vice president at the Republican State convention in 1855.
He served as delegate to the first and second Republican National Conventions in 1856 and 1860.
During the Civil War served as chairman of the Guernsey County Military Committee.
Internal revenue collector for the sixteenth Ohio district, by appointment of President Lincoln from 1862 to 1869.
He served as delegate to the third State constitutional convention in 1873.
He served as member of the State board of charities in 1875.
He served as president of the board of school examiners of the Cambridge Union School 1881-1883.
He died in Cambridge, Ohio, October 21, 1883.
He was interred in South Cemetery.

Sources

1816 births
1883 deaths
People from Carlisle, Pennsylvania
Opposition Party members of the United States House of Representatives from Ohio
Ohio Republicans
People from Cambridge, Ohio
Ohio Constitutional Convention (1873)
19th-century American newspaper publishers (people)
19th-century American journalists
American male journalists
19th-century American male writers
19th-century American politicians
Journalists from Ohio